The 1972 Rugby League World Cup Final was the conclusive game of the 1972 Rugby League World Cup tournament and was played between Great Britain and Australia on 11 November 1972 at the Stade de Gerland ground in Lyon, France. The final was played before 4,231 fans who witnessed what is (as of 2020) the last British team to win the Rugby League World Cup.

Background

The 1972 Rugby League World Cup was the sixth staging of the Rugby League World Cup since its inauguration in 1954, and the first since the 1970 tournament. The tournament was held in the France from 28 October, culminating in the final between Great Britain and Australia on 11 November.

Great Britain

Scores and results list Australia's points tally first.

Great Britain were undefeated going into the final.

Australia

Scores and results list Great Britain's points tally first.

Match details

The French public seemed uninterested in a final that did not involve the home team, as less than 4,500 spectators turned up. Indeed, out of the seven games in the World Cup tournament, including the final, the only games that drew over 10,000 fans were two of the three games in which the French team played. The Final actually drew the lowest attendance of the tournament.

The game will always be remembered by the British for their captain Clive Sullivan's wonderful long distance try and by the Australians for perhaps "the greatest try never scored", later shown on TV to be legitimately scored by Australian fullback Graeme Langlands who chased and dived to catch Dennis Ward's bomb in mid-air, but it disallowed by French referee Georges Jameau who believed the Australian captain to be offside. Mike Stephenson scored the 73rd-minute try that helped Great Britain level the scores and secure the World Cup.

Had Aussie winger Ray Branighan succeeded with a 79th-minute penalty or Bob Fulton landed one of three drop goal attempts in the last five minutes, the cup could easily have gone to Australia. But for the first time in the competition's history the scores were level at full-time. An additional twenty minutes extra time was played, but no further score resulted, and Great Britain were awarded the cup by virtue of a better position in the table.

References

Rugby League World Cup finals
final
Sports competitions in Lyon
Rugby League World Cup
20th century in Lyon